Sherborne House is the name of more than one house in Britain.  It may refer to:

Sherborne House, Dorset
Sherborne House, Gloucestershire